The Essendon District Football League (EDFL) is a semi-professional Australian rules football league competition based in Essendon, Victoria, consisting of teams based in the north-west suburbs of Melbourne. Founded in 1930, the men's competition consists of three leagues: Premier Division, Division 1 and Division 2, with 10 clubs in the Premier Division and Division 1 nine in Division  2.

Promotion and relegation between these divisions occurs, with the lowest-placed clubs in the Premier Division and Division 1 being relegated at the end of each season. Clubs which win the Division 1 and Division 2 premierships are automatically promoted. Each men's team also fields a reserves side and an under-19 side that play a fixture mirroring that of the senior side.

Since 2017, the League has also run a competition for women's Australian rules football. In its inaugural year, this was a joint competition featuring teams from the EDFL as well as the Western Region Football League (WRFL). In 2018, 13 teams competed in a single division season, expanding to 19 teams and two divisions in 2019.

Clubs

Current

Notes
 ^ denotes that the club's most recent senior premiership was in Division 1 or the B Grade.
 + denotes that the club's most recent senior premiership was in Division 2 or the C Grade.
 1 Coburg Districts first entered the competition in 1981, before departing after the conclusion of the 1987 EDFL season. The club re-entered the competition from the 2013 EDFL season onwards.
 2 Keilor Park did not field a side in the 2018 EDFL season.
 3 East Sunbury did not field a side in the 2022 EDFL season.

Former

Premiers

EDFL Women's

History

In partnership with the Western Region Football League (WRFL), in 2016 the two leagues established the Western Region & Essendon District Women's Football League, an eleven-team open-age competition for women.

In 2018, the EDFL established its own Women's competition, consisting of 13 teams. , despite competing in the 2017 joint competition, did not field a side, while  and  fielded a joint team under the Avondale Heights–Taylors Lakes moniker.

In 2019, the competition expanded to 19 teams and was split into two divisions – a 10-club Premier Division and a nine-club Division 1.  became the first team to field two sides, one in each division.

Clubs

Juniors matches
The juniors consist of: Under 8s, Under 10s, Under 14s, Under 16s and Under 18.5s. There are also youth girls teams in the junior divisions. There are eight junior divisions at this level and each team listed in the senior section has at least one junior team in divisions 1, 2 or 3 for each age group, however many clubs have more in divisions 4, 5, 6, 7 and 8.

Junior Only Clubs

References

External links
 Official website 
 EDFL Records and History at Full Points Footy

 
Australian rules football competitions in Victoria (Australia)
Sports leagues established in 1930
Essendon, Victoria